František Zach (/František Zah; 1 May 1807 – 14 January 1892), known as Franjo Zah (Фрањо Зах), was a Czech-born soldier and military theorist, best known for his service to the Principality of Serbia, being the first acting General and Chief of the Serbian General Staff from 1876 to 1877.

Zach was known for being a flamboyant freedom fighter and Pan-Slavist, fighting in both the November Uprising in Poland of 1830, as well as in Serbia during the latter half of the 19th century. He played a vital role in the formation of the Načertanije in 1844, which later served as a guideline for the unification of Serbs divided by Ottoman and Austro-Hungarian rule. He was also the first Dean of the Academic Board of the Military Academy in Serbia and its chief from 1850–1859; 1860–1865; and 1868–1874.

Biography
František Alexander Zach was born on 19 April 1807 in Olomouc, a town in the Margraviate of Moravia, then part of the Austrian Empire. His father was a landlord, who soon after his birth inherited the roadside tavern "At the Black Eagle" in Brno. He finished gymnasium in Brno in 1824, and the Faculty of Law at the University of Vienna, then worked as a clerk in numerous locations across Moravia.

He participated in the failed 1830–31 rebellion in Russian Poland. He then emigrated, first to France in 1832 where he studied military theory, then joined the circle of Polish magnate Adam Czartoryski. As Czartoryski's trusted man, he was sent in late 1843 to Belgrade, the capital of the Principality of Serbia, he entered the elite, befriending influential statesman Ilija Garašanin.

Zach participated in the 1848 Slavic Congress as a member of the Czech-Slovak delegation. Upon returning to Belgrade in 1849, Zach founded the Belgrade artillery school where he became its headmaster and teacher, he worked there from 1850 to 1860. The school later became the Belgrade Military Academy. Zach was also the founder of the Serbian arsenal in Kragujevac, Zastava Arms. 

Later on, he became the military advisor for prince Milan Obrenović, who in 1876 gave Zach the commission of Chief of the General Staff. Zach was the first Serbian general to have a full military commission, and the first Czech ever to reach such a high commission whilst serving abroad. He was heavily wounded and lost his leg in 1876 while leading the Ibar Army in an engagement with a Turkish force under Mehmed Ali Pasha, he was replaced by Colonel Ilija Čolak-Antić. General Ranko Alimpić and General Milojko Lešjanin commanded the Drina Army and Timok Army, respectively. He signed the ratification of the Greek–Serbian Alliance in November 1868. He retired in 1883.

Zach died in Brno in 1892 after retiring from a long military career and being disappointed with politics. A street in Brno, as well as in Belgrade was named after him in his honour. In his native Olomouc, there is a museum dedicated to him.

He was awarded the Order of the White Eagle and a number of other decorations from various countries.

Military ranks

References

Citations

Sources

1807 births
1892 deaths
Military personnel from Brno
People from the Margraviate of Moravia
Immigrants to the Principality of Serbia
Serbian people of Czech descent
Chiefs of the Serbian General Staff
Diplomats of the Hôtel Lambert
Members of the Serbian Learned Society
Serbian–Turkish Wars (1876–1878)
École Spéciale Militaire de Saint-Cyr alumni
Zastava Arms
People of the Slovak Uprising of 1848–49
Participants of the Slavic Congress in Prague 1848